Rovaniemi Airport  is the third busiest airport in Finland, located in Rovaniemi, Finland, about  north of Rovaniemi city centre. The Arctic Circle crosses the runway closer to its northern end.

History 
The airport was built in 1940 with two grass-surfaced runways. During the Continuation War it served as an airbase and supply center for German Luftwaffe.

Facilities 
In 2017, the airport served about 580,000 passengers. The main season of charter traffic from Great Britain and many other European countries lasts from the end of November until the middle of January annually. Many of these flights (especially from Great Britain) are day trip flights, with daytrippers (mostly families with young children) arriving in the morning and going home in the evening on the same day. Russians arrive in January because they celebrate Christmas later.

The  (Air unit of the Frontier guard of Lapland) is also located nearby.

General aviation operators and private pilot owners are served by the provision of a dedicated fully enclosed and heated hangar with a curved snow-shedding roof located near to the terminal complex.

Rovaniemi Airport is one of three airports in Finland that has jet bridges (the other two being Helsinki-Vantaa Airport and Oulu Airport). The airport is managed by Finavia. It is connected to the Rovaniemi city centre by an airport taxi and there are also multiple bus connections around Lapland, including to major winter sports centers.

Rovaniemi Airport is the third-busiest airport in Finland after Helsinki and Oulu airports. Santa Claus Village and Santa Park are situated within . The busiest time for the airport is in the Christmas season, when many people go on Santa Flights.

Airlines and destinations

Statistics

See also 
List of the largest airports in the Nordic countries

References

External links

 Finavia – Rovaniemi Airport
 AIP Finland – Rovaniemi Airport
 
 

Airports in Finland
Rovaniemi
Airports in the Arctic
Buildings and structures in Lapland (Finland)
Finnish Air Force bases
International airports in Finland